German submarine U-748 was a Type VIIC U-boat of Nazi Germany's Kriegsmarine built for service during World War II. Her keel was laid down on 20 August 1942 by Schichau-Werke of Danzig. She was commissioned on 31 July 1943 with Capitano di Corvetta Mario Arillo in command.

Design
German Type VIIC submarines were preceded by the shorter Type VIIB submarines. U-748 had a displacement of  when at the surface and  while submerged. She had two shafts and two  propellers.

U-748 was fitted with five  torpedo tubes (four fitted at the bow and one at the stern), fourteen torpedoes, one  SK C/35 naval gun, 220 rounds, and two twin  C/30 anti-aircraft guns. The boat had a complement of between forty-four and sixty.

References

Bibliography

External links

German Type VIIC submarines
World War II submarines of Germany
1943 ships
Ships built in Danzig
Ships built by Schichau
U-boats sunk in 1944
World War II submarines of Italy
Maritime incidents in May 1945